Casino Christian School (incorporating both Casino Christian Primary School and Casino Christian High School) is a non-Government Christian school located in North Casino, New South Wales, Australia, providing education to boys and girls from Kindergarten to Year 12.

History

Small beginnings (1993-1994) 
In 1993, a group of Christian parents had the idea to start up a local Christian school somewhere in the Casino/Richmond Valley area. The first meeting discussing this idea happened with about ten families not too long after.

Three Christian businessmen had been putting money into a fund to go towards inter-denominational Christian activities in the Casino area. This money ended up going towards the school.

After a long period of discussion and planning, local doctor Bruce King donated eight acres (three hectares) of land to and for the school, and a local builder offered to do all the earth-moving required on the school's land. A local retired builder offered to build the very first building, but the Christian mission, Mobile Mission Maintenance, stepped in and helped too.

This first building now serves as:
 the main toilet block
 canteen
 staff room
 high school English room
 library
 librarian's office
 teachers resource room

First five years (1995-1999) 
In 1995, the school opened with fifty-five students enrolled, ranging from Kindergarten to Year 6. Peter Robinson was the founding principal and served as this until 1999. Robinson taught Years 3 to 6, Miss Shelley Evans taught Kindy to Year 2 by Term 2, Mrs. Livingstone was employed to teach Years 3 and 4.

In 1996 numbers had increased quickly to over 75. A second building needed to be built urgently, which was done by another local man and his team with the help of Government Funding.

This second building now serves as (since 2008):
 Kindergarten/Year 1 classroom
 Year 2/Year 3 classroom
 Year 4/Year 5 classroom
 Year 5/Year 6 classroom
 SOLD rooms
 Primary art area

Also in 1999, Peter Robinson stepped down as school principal but has continued teaching in the school. Ern Case then took over the role and he retired after serving for 10 years. His replacement who commenced in January 2009 is Phil Johnson.

The High School Begins (2000-2003) 
In 2000 the Casino Christian High School began with the inaugural Year 7 class. The third building started to be constructed, which became the high school building and new administration offices. From 2001 to 2003, Years 8-10 were added, and the inaugural class graduated in 2003.

This building now serves as:
 History Room (where History, Geography, PDHPE and Biblical Studies are taught)
 Computer Room (where Computers, Mathematics and Commerce are taught)
 Food Tech Room (where Food Technology, LOTE and PDHPE are taught)
 Science Laboratory (where Science and Mathematics are taught)

2004 to the present day 
In 2005, a combined outdoor sports court of three tennis courts, two basketball courts, and two netball courts was built after many years of planning.

In 2007, approval for a new fourth building was given and in early 2008 construction began. This building was completed towards the end of 2008 and consists of new Technology, Music, and Art rooms. Commenced in late 2010 are another two buildings which are the new bigger Library and the Multi-Purpose Centre. In 2012 another building was added consisting of new toilets and change rooms for the high school and separate automotive and woodwork rooms. 

There are many minor projects underway including covered walkways, a new school entry, and a children's adventure playground.

As of the 2014 year 11 has been added as of year 12 in 2015.

Curriculum 
The Board of Studies has established 'indicative hours' which all students are expected to meet during the duration of their Primary school and the majority of their High school education.

See also 

 List of non-government schools in New South Wales
 Education in Australia

References

External links 
 

1995 establishments in Australia
Educational institutions established in 1995
Private primary schools in New South Wales
Private secondary schools in New South Wales